Neonemobius is a genus of crickets in the subfamily Nemobiinae.  All species are recorded from North America.

Taxonomy
The Orthoptera Species FileVe lists the following species:Neonemobius cubensis (Saussure, 1874) - type speciesNeonemobius eurynotus (Rehn & Hebard, 1918)Neonemobius mormonius (Scudder, 1896)Neonemobius palustris (Blatchley, 1900)Neonemobius toltecus (Saussure, 1859)Neonemobius variegatus'' (Bruner, 1893)

References

Ground crickets
Taxonomy articles created by Polbot